In English law, 'contributione facienda' is a writ which lies where several persons are jointly bound to the same thing, and one or more of them refuse to contribute their share.

For example, if tenants in common, or joint, hold a mill pro indiviso, and equally share the profits thereof; the mill falling to decay, and one or more of them refusing to contribute to its reparation, the rest shall have this writ to compel them.

See also
Contra formam collationis
Contra formam feoffamenti

References

Writs
English property law
English legal terminology
Legal documents with Latin names